The Surrey Championship is a cricket organisation in Surrey running 6 divisions for 1st & 2nd XI cricket, 4 for 3rd XI and 4 for 4th XI. Since 2000 it has been a designated ECB Premier League.

The teams competing in the Premier Division in 2020 will be: Ashtead, Banstead, East Molesey, Esher, Normandy, Reigate Priory, Sunbury, Cranleigh, Weybridge, and Wimbledon.

History
The competition was founded in 1968 by 17 clubs within Surrey, the idea to create a more competitive form of club cricket, rather than the friendly leagues that had previously been the formats for many clubs. The 17 founder member clubs were: Addiscombe, Banstead, Beddington, Cheam, Dulwich, East Molesey, Epsom, Guildford, Malden Wanderers, Mitcham, Old Emanuel, Old Whitgiftians, Purley, Spencer, Streatham, Sunbury and Sutton. Up until 1977, there were only 1st XI and 2nd XI sections within the organisation. The Eve Group became the first sponsors of the competition in 1982, and kept that role for 19 seasons, until Castle Lager became sponsors in 2001, Travelbag, were the sponsors up until 2016. The current sponsors are AJ Fordham Sports.

1st XI Champions

Performance by season from 2000

References

External links
Surrey Championship - official site
Surrey Championship - Play-Cricket site

English domestic cricket competitions
Cricket in Surrey
ECB Premier Leagues